Rodney Sawyers (born July 27, 1967) is a former NASCAR driver. He competed limited schedules in the racing series in 2001 and 2002.

Busch Series career
Sawyers ran an R & D Ford for two races in 2001 NASCAR Busch Series, helping out Hensley Racing. He made his first career race at Gateway, qualifying 34th. However, he fell out of the race extremely early and finishing 43rd, last place on the field. Sawyers then had a solid qualifying effort of 20th at IRP, before finishing 39th in the event due to clutch problems. Those were his only career starts in that series.

Craftsman Truck Series career
Sawyers ran six races a piece in this series in 2001 and 2002 seasons of the NASCAR Craftsman Truck Series. Sawyers drove his own #68 truck in 2001, making his series debut at Darlington. It was a good run for his team, as he started 26th, but managed an 18th-place run. In fact, all around it was a good year for Sawyers. He was in the top-20 five times in his six starts. Those were highlighted by a pair of 17ths at IRP and Nazareth.

Sawyers had another solid year in 2002, finishing no worse than 27th. His best career finish was set. He was 15th at Martinsville, one week before rolling to another solid run of 18th at Gateway. Sawyers other top-20 was a 19th at Pikes Peak.

Unfortunately, Sawyers team ran out of funding midway through 2002, and a promising career was axed. He has not raced in major NASCAR since a 27th-place finish at the Milwaukee Mile.

External links
 

1967 births
Living people
NASCAR drivers
People from Ridgeway, Virginia
Racing drivers from Virginia